Panathinaikos AC Women's Volleyball Team is a Greek volleyball team, part of the major Athens-based multi-sport club Panathinaikos A.O. The department was founded in 1969 and is the most successful women's volleyball team in Greece, in terms of Greek Championships won. They have won a record 24 Championships, 6 Cups, with 5 Doubles, while they hold the record for finishing undefeated the Championship 8 times (1971-1973, 1978, 1991, 1992, 1993, 2007). They hold also the record of 68 straight wins in the league including the play-offs.

They have also reached four times a European final four and two times a European final (2000 and 2009). The team currently plays in Maroussi Saint Thomas Indoor Hall.

In 2017, the club was relegated due to serious financial problems. They stayed inactive in the 2017–18 season.

Apart from the Greek players, who have traditionally been the backbone of Greece's national team, some of the greatest players in European volleyball that have played for the team over the years include Ruxandra Dumitrescu, Brižitka Molnar, Tammy Mahon, Jelena Lozancic, Olga Tocko, María Fernández, Sanja Tomasević and others.

The club has retired the jersey number 9 in honour of the team's legendary captain Ruxandra Dumitrescu.

Honours

Domestic
 Greek Championship (record): (24)
 1971, 1972, 1973, 1977, 1978, 1979, 1982, 1983, 1985, 1988, 1990, 1991, 1992, 1993, 1998, 2000, 2005, 2006, 2007, 2008, 2009, 2010, 2011, 2022
 Greek Cup: (6)
 2005, 2006, 2008, 2009, 2010, 2022
 Double: (6) 
 2005, 2006, 2008, 2009, 2010, 2022

European
  CEV Cup Winners Cup
 Runners-up (1): 2000
  CEV Challenge Cup
 Runners-up (1): 2009

Current women's volleyball squad
Season 2022–23

Technical and managerial staff

Retired numbers

Selected former players

  Jimena Pérez
  Margarita Stepanenko
  Polina Neykova
  Daniela Todorova
  Lira Ribas
  Jennifer Cross
  Marisa Field
  Tammy Mahon
  Kyla Richey
  Rachel Sánchez
  Manolina Konstantinou
  Alexia Rotsidou
  Jana Simankova
  Jana Zikmundova
  Jelena Lozancic
  Jana Franziska Poll
  Aggi Babuli
  Eva Chantava
  Eleftheria Chatzinikou
  Ruxandra Dumitrescu
  Eleni Fragiadaki
  Maria Garagouni
  Niki Garagouni
  Sofia Kosma
  Nikoletta Koutouxidou
  Lia Mitsi
  Xanthi Milona
  Chara Sakkoula
  Efi Sfyri
  Georgia Tzanakaki
  Tatjana Samodanova
  Olga Tocko
  Zanete Pizele
  Julia Salcevic
  Milica Budimir
  Jelena Mladenovic
  Brižitka Molnar
  Sanja Tomasevic
  Romana Hudecová
  Sonja Borovincek
  Marisa Fernández
  Monique Adams
  Trisha Bradford

Selected former coaches
  Sava Grozdanović
  Andreas Bergeles
  Nikos Bergeles
  Soulis Toursougas
  Jerzy Welz
  Giannis Nikolakis
  Dimitris Bahramis
  Takis Floros

Historical performance in the league

Positions

International record

Sponsorships

 Official Sport Clothing Manufacturer: Macron
 Golden Sponsor: OPAP
 Official Sponsors: Hygeia Medical Center, Avance Car Rental, Land Rover Spanos Luxury Cars, Viva Fresh, Batteries.gr, Biosteel, LCG. Boukia kai syhorio.
 Official Broadcaster: PAO TV

See also
 Panathinaikos Men's VC

References

External links
 Official website 

Panathinaikos A.O.
Greek volleyball clubs
Volleyball clubs established in 1969
Sports clubs in Athens
1969 establishments in Greece